Arthur or Art Williams may refer to:

Government and politics
Arthur B. Williams (1872–1925), U.S. congressman from Michigan
Arthur J. Williams, member of the North Carolina General Assembly
Arthur Henry Williams (1894–1968), Canadian trade unionist and politician
Arthur Henry Winnington Williams (1913–2012), member of the Jamaican House of Representatives
Arthur Trefusis Heneage Williams (1837–1885), Canadian politician and soldier
Arthur James Williams (politician) (1880–1962), British trade unionist and Lord Mayor of Cardiff
Arthur Williams (Australian politician) (1888–1968), Australian politician and member of the New South Wales Legislative Assembly
Arthur John Williams (1834–1911), Welsh lawyer, author and Member of Parliament for South Glamorganshire, 1885–1895
Arthur Williams (Samoan politician) (died 1953), member of the Legislative Council of Samoa

Sports
Art Williams (outfielder) (1877–1941), Major League Baseball player
Arthur Williams (footballer) (1902–1960), Australian rules footballer
Arthur Williams (cricketer) (active 1927/8), New Zealand cricketer
Art Williams (umpire) (1934–1979), National League umpire
Art Williams (1939–2018), American basketball player
Arthur Howard Williams (born 1950), Welsh chess master
Essop Moosa (born 1952/1953), South African soccer player under pseudonym Arthur Williams
Arthur Williams (boxer) (born 1964), American boxer
Arthur Williams (presenter) (born 1986), British television presenter and Paralympic cyclist

Other
Arthur Williams (actor) (1844–1915), English actor, singer and playwright
Arthur Williams (bishop) (1848–1914), Anglican colonial bishop
Arthur Williams (trade unionist) (1899–?), British trade union leader
Arthur Benjamin Williams Jr. (born 1935), bishop of the Episcopal Diocese of Ohio
Arthur Williams (electrical engineer) (1868–1937), American electrical engineer and executive 
Arthur Williams (priest) (1899–1974), English Anglican Archdeacon of Bodmin
Arthur J. Williams Jr., American-born counterfeiter and subject of the book, The Art of Making Money
Arthur Williams (Elevator Bandit) (1946–2010), American career criminal known as the "Elevator Bandit"
Arthur E. Williams (born 1938), U.S. Army general
Arthur L. Williams Jr. (born 1942), founder of Primerica Financial Services
Lukyn Williams (Arthur Lukyn Williams, 1853–1943), Christian author
Arthur Stanley Williams (1861–1938), British solicitor and amateur astronomer
Arthur James Williams, pilot who helped develop aviation in Guyana, then British Guiana
Arthur Llewellyn Williams (1856–1919), bishop of Nebraska
Arthur Williams (rugby league) (1902–1948), Australian rugby league footballer